The Toana John Mountains are a mountain range in Elko County, Nevada. Possibly, the range is named for an Indian chief "Toana John."

References 

McLane, Alvin R. Silent Cordilleras, The Mountain Ranges of Nevada. Reno: Camp Nevada Monograph Number 4, 1978.

Mountain ranges of Nevada
Mountain ranges of Elko County, Nevada